Cove Beach may refer to:
Cove Beach, Prince Edward County, Ontario
Cove Beach, Simcoe County, Ontario
Cove Beach, Oregon